Sanjida Khatun (born 4 April 1933) is a Bangladeshi musicologist. She was awarded India's fourth highest civilian award the Padma Shri in 2021.

Biography
Khatun completed her bachelor's in Bengali literature from the University of Dhaka in 1955. She earned her MA degree in Bangla language from Visva Bharati University in 1957.

Khatun joined the faculty of the University of Dhaka to teach Bengali literature.
Khatun was one of the founders of Bangladesh Mukti Sangrami Shilpi Sangstha during the Liberation War in 1971 and Chhayanaut in the early 1960s. She served as the president of Chhayanat.

Khatun was married to Wahidul Huq and has 3 children- Apala Farhat Naved (late), Partha Tanveer Naved, Ruchira Tabassum Naved.

Awards
 2021 - Padma Shri, by the Government of India
 2012 - Deshikottoma by Visva-Bharati University
 2010 - Rabindra Award 
 2010 - Lifetime Achievement Award by 5th Citycell-Channel I Music Awards
 1998 - Bangla Academy Literary Award
 1991 - Ekushey Padak
 Kabi Jasimuddin Award

References

1933 births
Living people
Recipients of the Ekushey Padak
Recipients of Bangla Academy Award
University of Dhaka alumni
Academic staff of the University of Dhaka
Visva-Bharati University alumni
Recipients of the Padma Shri